is the fifth studio album by Japanese singer Mie. Released on October 21, 2007 through her own label MHO, the album marked Mie's first studio release since Diamond & Gold in 1992. me ing is also the first album to feature songs written by Mie herself.

Track listing

References

External links
 
 
 

2007 albums
Mie albums
Japanese-language albums